Alma-Ville is the 12th and final studio album by American jazz pianist Vince Guaraldi, released in the U.S. by Warner Bros.-Seven Arts in December 1969.

Background
Vince Guaraldi's final three albums released during his lifetime were recorded for Warner Bros.-Seven Arts after spending considerable time struggling to extricate himself from Fantasy Records. Warner signed Guaraldi to a three-record deal, and insisted that his inaugural release consist of his Peanuts songs. Guaraldi responded with new renditions of eight of his most popular scores from those programs on his first release, Oh Good Grief!. Guaraldi was then given complete artistic control over his sophomore, self-produced Warner effort, The Eclectic Vince Guaraldi, resulting in an unfocused and overindulgent album that was not well received by both critics and consumers.

At Warner's insistence, arranger Shorty Rogers was recruited to produce Guaraldi's final album, Alma-Ville. The album is notable for featuring a cover of The Beatles’ song "Eleanor Rigby", which Guaraldi had been regularly performing during his live sets. The album's title track is a new recording of a song originally recorded eight years earlier for the album Jazz Impressions of Black Orpheus.

Reception
Though deemed a focused improvement over The Eclectic Vince Guaraldi, Warner Bros. lost interest in Guaraldi and did not promote Alma-Ville, letting him go at the end of their three-record deal. Both The Eclectic Vince Guaraldi and Alma-Ville fell into obscurity, with Oh Good Grief! remaining in print and a steady seller due to the perpetual popularity of the Peanuts franchise.

A remastered edition of Alma-Ville was released on July 6, 2018, by Omnivore Recordings as part of the 2-CD set The Complete Warner Bros.–Seven Arts Recordings.

Track listing

Session information
Credits adapted from remastered 2018 CD liner notes.

"The Masked Marvel"
Written by Vince Guaraldi
Piano: Vince Guaraldi
Guitar: Eddie Duran
Double bass: Kelly Bryan
Drums: Al Coster
Recorded in mid-to-late October 1969

"Cristo Redentor"
Written by Duke Pearson
Piano: Vince Guaraldi
Guitar: Eddie Duran
Double bass: Kelly Bryan
Drums: Al Coster
Recorded in mid-to-late October 1969

"Detained in San Ysidro"
Written by Vince Guaraldi
Piano: Vince Guaraldi
Guitar: Herb Ellis
Double bass: Monty Budwig
Drums: Colin Bailey
Recorded on October 10, 1969

"Eleanor Rigby"
Written by John Lennon and Paul McCartney
Piano: Vince Guaraldi
Guitar: Herb Ellis
Double bass: Monty Budwig
Drums: Colin Bailey
Recorded in mid-to-late October 1969

"Uno Y Uno"
Written by Vince Guaraldi
Piano, lead guitar: Vince Guaraldi
Double bass: Kelly Bryan
Drums: Al Coster
Recorded in mid-to-late October 1969

"Alma-Ville"
Written by Vince Guaraldi
Piano: Vince Guaraldi
Guitar: Herb Ellis
Double bass: Monty Budwig
Drums: Colin Bailey
Recorded on October 10, 1969

"Rio From the Air"
Written by Vince Guaraldi
Piano, guitar: Vince Guaraldi
Electric bass: Sebastião Neto
Drums: Dom Um Romão
Percussion: Rubens Bassini
Recorded in mid-to-late October 1969

"Watch What Happens"
Written by Norman Gimbel and Antoine Le Grand
Piano: Vince Guaraldi
Guitar: Eddie Duran
Double bass: Kelly Bryan
Drums: Al Coster
Recorded in mid-to-late October 1969

"Jambo’s"
Written by Vince Guaraldi
Piano: Vince Guaraldi
Guitar: Herb Ellis
Double bass: Monty Budwig
Drums: Colin Bailey
Percussion: Rubens Bassini
Recorded on October 10, 1969

References

External links
 

1969 albums
Vince Guaraldi albums
Warner Records albums
Albums arranged by Shorty Rogers
Peanuts music